Oscar Fredrik Torp (8 June 1893 – 1 May 1958) was a Norwegian politician for the Norwegian Labour Party. He was party leader from 1923 to 1945, and mayor of Oslo in 1935 and 1936. In 1935 he became the acting minister of Defence in the government of Johan Nygaardsvold. He was also the minister of Social Affairs from 1936 to 1939, and then the minister of Finance from 1939 to 1942. He was appointed Minister of Defence again in 1942 in the London-based Norwegian exile government. He continued until the election in 1945 when he became the minister of Provisioning and Reconstruction until 1948.

Hailing from Skjeberg, he was first elected to the Parliament of Norway representing Oslo in 1936, but did not take a seat in the Parliament until 1948. He then became the faction leader for the Labour Party in Parliament. He became the 23rd prime minister of Norway in 1951 when Einar Gerhardsen stepped down from this position; the move was reversed in 1955 when Torp became the president of the Storting. He held this position until his death.

Early life and career
He was born in Skjeberg as a son of Anton Fredrik Andersen Torp (1865–1907) and Anne Bolette Andreassen Gade (1867–1932). He had eight siblings, and lost his father at a young age. His father worked in Canada from 1903, and sailed home to collect his family to emigrate to Canada in 1907. However he died en route, near Liverpool. Torp attended primary school before joining the workforce at age 13. He eventually became an electrician, and already at the age of 14 he became deputy treasurer in his local trade union. He also joined the Norwegian Labour Party, and was elected to the national board in 1918, when an opposition of revolutionaries assumed power in the party. Torp chaired the party chapter in Sarpsborg from 1919 to 1921 and in Østfold county from 1921 to 1923. He was also a supervisory council member in the Norwegian Confederation of Trade Unions from 1920 to 1925, and board chairman of Østfold Arbeiderblad from 1921 to 1923. He was married to Kari Hansen (1893–1967) since April 1916. He was the father of Reidar Torp.

Party chairman and cabinet member
In 1922 Torp was a delegate at the Fourth Comintern Congress. In 1923 the revolutionary wing that had assumed power in the Labour Party in 1918 had split into two wings, one for and one against Comintern membership. Torp belonged to the latter wing, which assumed power at the 1923 national convention. Torp was elected chairman of the entire party. When he became chairman, the chairman of the party's youth wing (Peder Furubotn) was four years older than he was. Torp chaired the party until 1945. It has often been said, however, that Martin Tranmæl was the "real" chairman of the Labour Party.

Torp had been a member of Sarpsborg city council from 1919 to 1923 and deputy member of Aker municipal council from 1925 to 1928 when he in 1930 moved to Oslo. He served as mayor in 1935 and 1936, and was elected to the Parliament of Norway in the 1936 Norwegian parliamentary election. By that time he had already become acting Minister of Defence in Nygaardsvold's Cabinet, filling in for Fredrik Monsen who was ill. He was then Minister of Social Affairs from November 1936 to July 1939, and Minister of Finance from July 1939 to March 1942. In April 1940 Norway had been invaded by Nazi Germany, and Torp was responsible for initiating the successful flight of the Norwegian National Treasury. After overseeing the start of the flight, he fled together with the rest of Nygaardsvold's Cabinet. In Åndalsnes he was injured in the foot during the German air raids. The Cabinet ultimately reached Tromsø where they embarked for England, where they stayed until the war's end. Torp was acting Minister of Defence from November 1941 to February 1942, and then the permanent Minister of Defence from March 1942 to November 1945, in Nygaardsvold's and Gerhardsen's First Cabinet. Torp was a former antimilitarist, and was imprisoned for five months in 1924 as he called for a military strike, but shed this ideology from the mid-1930s.

Before the Second World War, Torp was also chairman of Bærumsbanen from 1935 to 1940, Oslo Sporveier from 1935 to 1940 and the Oslo airport committee from 1935 to 1940. He was a board member of Folketeaterbygningen from 1935 to 1940, Idrettskomiteen av 1935, and Felleskomiteen for forstadsbanene from 1935 to 1940. He was a deputy board member of Norges Kommunalbank from 1935 to 1940. All of these positions were lost when he fled the country.

Post-war career
The German occupation ended on 8 May 1945, and the exiled politicians returned home. Torp chaired the Government Delegation from London to Oslo on 14 May 1945, and until 31 May 1945 he was thus the acting Prime Minister and acting Minister of Foreign Affairs in Oslo.

Much because of his exile, Torp was no longer found fit to be party chairman, and was replaced, against the party by-laws. He was also demoted to Minister of Provisioning and Reconstruction in Gerhardsen's Second Cabinet. He was pressured to leave this office as well, and left on 10 January 1948. He sat through his parliamentary term to which he had been elected in 1945; until 1948 the deputy Eugen Amandus Pettersen had taken his seat. He was also the Labour Party parliamentary leader. He moved to Vestfold in 1948 as he was appointed County Governor there. After a short time, he decided to stand for election again, and in 1949 he was elected for the Market towns of Vestfold county. In the same year he was one of the architects behind the Norwegian NATO membership.

Prime Minister
In November 1951 a political shock happened in Norway as Einar Gerhardsen unexpectedly resigned as Prime Minister of Norway. Gerhardsen then asked Oscar Torp to take over. Reportedly, Gerhardsen favored Sverre Støstad, but he rejected the offer. Torp led his cabinet for four years, and also had to double as acting Minister of Trade and Shipping from 3 to 15 June 1954. Carl Henry took his seat in Parliament.

Domestic statesmanship
Torp was pressured to give the position back to Gerhardsen in January 1955, when Gerhardsen had strengthened himself for a few years as party chairman and President of the Storting. Torp, who was re-elected to Parliament in 1953 and 1957, succeeded Gerhardsen as President of the Storting, a position he held until his death. He was also County Governor until his death, albeit he was absent from the position for most of the time. Gunvor Katharina Eker took his seat after his death.

Torp was a member of the Labour Party central board and national board from 1945 to his death. He was also a board member of the Norwegian State Railways from 1948–1957 and chairman of the supervisory council of Folketeatret from 1948 to his death. In Vestfold he held a multitude of local chairmanships, including of the county tax board and the administration of the Diocese of Tunsberg.

Death 
Torp had a cerebral haemorrhage in the early 1950s, which he kept secret to most his acquaintances, even family. On 1 May 1958 he had a new cerebral haemorrhage, this time with a fatal outcome. He died at Rikshospitalet. This was May Day, and Torp was scheduled as the main speaker in Stavanger. He was not able to do it, and thus, Arne Skaug read Torp's manuscript. When the speech was referred to in the newspapers the next day, it was accompanied by obituaries of Torp. He was buried at Vår Frelsers gravlund. A memorial stone was raised in Skjeberg in 1976.

Books about Torp include Nils Hønsvald's Oscar Torp, released in 1959, and Egil Helle's Oscar Torp – arbeidergutt og statsmann, released in 1983. In 2007 Hans Olav Lahlum released Oscar Torp. En politisk biografi.

References

1893 births
1958 deaths
People from Sarpsborg
Østfold politicians
Politicians from Aker
Mayors of Oslo
Vestfold politicians
Government ministers of Norway
Ministers of Trade and Shipping of Norway
Presidents of the Storting
Members of the Storting
Prime Ministers of Norway
County governors of Norway
Norwegian prisoners and detainees
Prisoners and detainees of Norway
Norwegian expatriates in the United Kingdom
Norwegian people of World War II
Burials at the Cemetery of Our Saviour
Ministers of Finance of Norway
Leaders of the Labour Party (Norway)
20th-century Norwegian politicians
Defence ministers of Norway